The Sardinata River  is a river of Colombia. It drains into Lake Maracaibo via the Catatumbo River.

See also
List of rivers of Colombia

References
Rand McNally, The New International Atlas, 1993.

Rivers of Colombia